Martha Bloom is an American artist.

Bloom received her artistic education at the Art Students League in New York City, and subsequently taught classes there for children.

Museum collections 
Metropolitan Museum of Art, New York, NY
National Academy, New York, NY
Columbia Museum of Art, Columbia, SC
McNay Art Museum, San Antonio, TX
Delaware Art Museum, Wilmington, DE
Library of Congress, Washington, DC
PMW Print Collection, New York, NY

Bloom's works are in numerous private and corporate collections.

References

External links 
http://www.asllinea.org/martha-bloom-exhibitions/

American artists
Living people
Year of birth missing (living people)
Place of birth missing (living people)
Art Students League of New York alumni
Art Students League of New York faculty
American women artists
American women academics
21st-century American women